Saving Leningrad, also known as Battle of Leningrad is a 2019 Russian war drama film written about the Road of Life, the tragedy of blood "barge 752", which took place on the night of September 16 to 17, 1941, at Lake Ladoga. During the evacuation of people from Leningrad, the barge was bombed by Nazi warplanes and went to the bottom, killing more than 1,000 people. At the same time, 460 people were killed in a barge towed by the gunship, "Selemdzha", which was carrying fuel and military supplies to Leningrad. Few were saved. The film takes place during the Eastern Front in World War II and focuses on the beginning of the Siege of Leningrad.
                                            
The film was directed by Aleksey Kozlov, who co-wrote the screenplay and produced by Arkady Fateev. It stars Maria Melnikova as Nastya Tkachyova, Andrey Mironov-Udalov as cadet Kostya Gorelov, as well as Gela Meskhi, Anastasiya Melnikova in their debut cinematic roles.

Saving Leningrad was released in the Russian Federation by Universal Pictures International on January 27, 2019, on the eve of the 75th anniversary of the lifting of the blockade in Saint Petersburg (Then, Leningrad).

Background 

Leningraders, sent to evacuation in Lake Ladoga, became victims of flooding of the barge at number 752. (ru)

A story based on real events of the imprint of barge number 752 which was used as a fishing boat and supplied food to the besieged Leningrad on the Road of life. On the night of September 17, 1941, during the evacuation of people from Leningrad, the barge leaked and sank in the depths of the Ladoga Lake with a thousand people on it. At the same time, 460 people died on a barge towed by the boat "Selemzha", which carried military reinforcements to Leningrad. Together with "Selemzha", The boat "Oryol" helped to tow the barge and together they managed to save 240 people, 216 and 24 people respectively. A total of 433 cadets, 132 graduates of the Military Medical Academy, 8 junior officers, 36 officers and 46 women, as well as all those who were on the barge with their children and 30 civilian workers and members of the Naval Medical Academy and the Navy's Hydrographic Administration, which included more than 685 people.

In addition, a whole class of cadets of the Leningrad Military School of Engineering and the students of the vocational school, along with officers, women and all the children and technical and artillery personnel who were with them, perished. Among those who survived were 184 people (160 who were brought to the Oryol and 24 to the Selemzha), which belonged to the Naval Medical Academy and the Navy's Hydrographic Administration, and another 56 civilians.

Plot 
In the Soviet Union during September 1941 there was an emergency evacuation of people from Leningrad across Lake Ladoga. By a twist of fate, a young couple, cadet-gunner Kostya Gorelov and his girlfriend Nastya Tkachyova, are on board the dilapidated barge 752, the purpose of which is the evacuation of the inhabitants of the Siege of Leningrad. The barge is badly worn out, but Nikolai Gorelov, Kostya’s father, taking responsibility, ordered it loaded with over 1,000 people, among them his son. Among the evacuees is NKVD investigator Vadim Petruchik, who led the case against Nastya's father.

The case of the repressed father Nastya was reviewed. He was released and sent to the front, to the same section of the front as the barge. The cadets, who were marching to the barge were stopped, and the cadets-gunners were sent to take back the channel.

At night, the ship gets into a storm and suffers disaster. At the site of the tragedy, the first to come are not rescuers, but enemy aircraft.

Cast

Production

Filming 
The shooting process ran from May through July 2018 and extended 60 shifts. Some of the shooting was done in Moscow, Saint Petersburg and Nizhny Novgorod Oblast.

Filming took place in Saint Petersburg and its environs in May 2018 in collaboration with Lenfilm.
In June 2018, additional photographs were taken on the shore of the province of Lake Ilmen in the Novgorod Oblast.

Release 
Saving Leningrad was released in the Russian Federation by Universal Pictures Russia on January 27, 2019.

Reception 
The film received average ratings from film critics. On the Megacritic website it scored 5.8 points out of 10 according to 12 reviews. InterMedia columnist Denis Stupnikov wrote: "The film becomes a hymn to mutual assistance, thanks to which realistically outlined the shortcomings of each character in the end completely leveled".

Others criticized the film for poor acting, primitive direction, inconsistency with real events, illogical behavior of characters, poor ragged editing, and a disjointed script. Why the film failed at the box office.

See also
 Attack on Leningrad (2009 film)

References

External links 
 
 
 

2010s historical drama films
2019 war drama films
2019 drama films
2019 films
Drama films based on actual events
Eastern Front of World War II films
Films about social class
Films about survivors of seafaring accidents or incidents
Films about the Soviet Union in the Stalin era
Films set in Russia
Films set in Saint Petersburg
Films set in the 1940s
Films set in the Soviet Union
Films set on ships
Films shot in Russia
Films shot in Saint Petersburg
Films scored by Yuri Poteyenko
Russian disaster films
Russian historical drama films
Russian romantic drama films
Russian war drama films
2010s Russian-language films
Seafaring films based on actual events
Siege films
Teen war films
War romance films
World War II films based on actual events
Universal Pictures films
Russian World War II films